Cyrille Laventure (born 29 March 1964 in Fort-de-France, Martinique) is a French athlete who specializes in 5,000 meters. Laventure competed at the 1988 Summer Olympics .

References

Olympic athletes of France
French people of Martiniquais descent
1964 births
Athletes (track and field) at the 1988 Summer Olympics
Living people
Martiniquais athletes
French male long-distance runners